Rosemary Brigitte Woodroffe is a British ecologist and academic.

Education
Woodroffe was educated at the Somerville College, Oxford and was awarded Bachelor of Arts degree in 1989 followed by a Doctor of Philosophy in 1992 for research on factors affecting reproductive success in the European badger, Meles meles L. supervised by David Macdonald.

Career
From 1993-1994 she was a research associate at the Institute of Zoology, the research division of the Zoological Society of London.  From 1994-1998 she was a research fellow at Gonville and Caius College, Cambridge.  From 1998 to 2001 she was a lecturer in ecology & epidemiology at the University of Warwick. From 2001 to 2007 she was at the Department of Wildlife, Fish & Conservation Biology at the University of California, Davis as assistant professor, associate professor and finally professor of conservation biology.  In 2007 returned to the Institute of Zoology in London as a senior research fellow.

Personal life
Rosie is the daughter of fantasy artist Patrick Woodroffe.

References

Alumni of Somerville College, Oxford
British ecologists
Women ecologists
University of California, Davis faculty
British women scientists

Living people
Year of birth missing (living people)